Eileen is a given name.

Eileen may also refer to:

Eileen (musical), 1917
Eileen (novel), a 2015 novel by Ottessa Moshfegh
Eileen (film), a 2023 film based upon the novel by Ottessa Moshfegh
Eileen, Wisconsin, United States

See also
"Come On Eileen", a 1982 song by Dexys Midnight Runners
Aileen, a given name
Aylin, a given name
Helen (disambiguation)
Ilene, a given name